A sýsla is a police district in Iceland and the Faroe Islands, and formerly in Denmark and Norway.

For the historical entity see: syssel.

Faroe Islands sýsla
 Norðoyar
 Eysturoy
 Streymoy
 Vágar
 Sandoy
 Suðuroy

Iceland
 Árnessýsla
 Austur-Barðastrandarsýsla
 Austur-Húnavatnssýsla
 Austur-Skaftafellssýsla
 Borgarfjarðarsýsla
 Dalasýsla
 Eyjafjarðarsýsla
 Gullbringusýsla
 Kjósarsýsla
 Mýrasýsla
 Norður-Ísafjarðarsýsla
 Norður-Múlasýsla
 Norður-Þingeyjarsýsla
 Rangárvallasýsla
 Skagafjarðarsýsla
 Snæfellsnes-og Hnappadalssýsla
 Strandasýsla
 Suður-Múlasýsla
 Suður-Þingeyjarsýsla
 Vestur-Barðastrandarsýsla
 Vestur-Húnavatnssýsla
 Vestur-Ísafjarðarsýsla
 Vestur-Skaftafellssýsla

Types of administrative division
Administrative divisions in Europe

fo:Sýsla